Roed or Røed is a surname. Notable people with the surname include: 

Bolette Roed (born 1979), Danish recorder player
Eivind Daniel Røed (born 1992), Norwegian football player and manager
Fritz Røed (1928–2002), Norwegian sculptor
Gullik Madsen Røed (1786–1857), Norwegian soldier and farmer
Holger Roed (1846–1874), Danish painter
Jørgen Roed (1808–1888), Danish portrait and genre painter
Margrethe Røed (born 1976), Norwegian television presenter
Reidun Røed (1921–2009), Norwegian resistance member
Thomas Røed (born 1974), Norwegian football player
Tine Susanne Miksch Roed (born 1964), Danish administrator and business executive
Vegard Røed (born 1975), Norwegian football player